The Real World: Brooklyn is the twenty-first season of MTV's reality television series The Real World, which focuses on a group of diverse strangers living together for several months in a different city each season, as cameras follow their lives and interpersonal relationships. It is the fourth season of The Real World to be filmed in the Mid-Atlantic region of the United States, specifically in New York City after The Real World: Back to New York.

It was the first season to include an openly transgender cast member, Katelynn Cusanelli. It also is the first season to feature more than seven cast members, as it featured eight housemates living on Pier 41 in Red Hook. Although it is the only season to set in the borough of Brooklyn, it is also the third season to take place in a city that had hosted a previous season, as the show's first and tenth seasons were set in New York in 1992 and 2001.

The season was aired as 13 one-hour episodes. MTV announced the location in May 2008. The series premiered January 7, 2009, and garnered an 18% increase in ratings over the previous season with 2.3 million viewers. The premiere was made available on iTunes on January 8. On January 4, MTV aired a special called The Real World: Secrets Revealed that documents the evolution of the series over the years.

Prior to the beginning of the season Jon Murray, co-creator of The Real World, and Chairman and President of Bunim-Murray Productions, explained the choice of Brooklyn: "The Brooklyn season, like the Hollywood season, will focus on what people loved about 'The Real World' when it launched in 1992 - genuine people, meaningful conflict and powerful stories...We're thrilled that MTV is allowing 'The Real World' turn 21!" Cast member Chet Cannon remarked on the city that was his home for three months, "Brooklyn is usually spoken of as more a place where you don’t want to go — I just don’t want to get shot down here."

Anthony Swofford, author of Jarhead, makes an appearance this season when cast member Ryan Conklin attends a meeting of Iraq Veterans Against the War.

In 2010, the season was nominated for a GLAAD Media Award for Outstanding Reality Program.

Season changes
Almost every season of The Real World, beginning with its fifth season, has included the assignment of a season-long group job or task to the housemates, continued participation in which has been mandatory to remain part of the cast since the Back to New York season. However, no group assignment is given to the cast this season; the castmates are free to pursue their own interests, the first such season to do this since the fourth season. The group assignment returned the following season, though producer Jon Murray indicated a desire to dispense with the group assignment again with The Real World: Washington D.C.

Brooklyn is the first season of the series to feature eight cast members moving into the residence together in the premiere. (All previous seasons premiered with seven-member casts, and only introduced new cast members when the departure of others during production necessitated replacements.) This number remains in subsequent seasons. It is also the first season to include an openly transgender cast member, Katelynn Cusanelli.

This is the first season, and the first MTV series, to be broadcast in high definition.

The residence

It was originally reported that the cast would be staying at the BellTel Lofts in Downtown Brooklyn, but problems obtaining permits for the construction required MTV to seek a new location. The production chose Pier 41 at 204 Van Dyke Street in the Red Hook area of Brooklyn. Pier 41 was also used as the setting for a bar scene in the 2005 Will Smith film, Hitch. This marked the second time a pier was used as a season residence for the cast after 1998's The Real World: Seattle.

Cast
This was the first season of Real World to feature a cast of eight roommates living together. The cast included a trans woman, Katelynn Cusanelli, a first for the series. The cast was photographed publicly for the first time at a Semi Precious Weapons New York Fashion Week party at the Manhattan club Rebel in early September 2008.

: Age at time of filming.

Episodes

After filming
The Real World: Brooklyn Reunion premiered on April 1, 2009, following the premiere of the season finale. The program, hosted by Maria Menounos, featured all eight housemates. Ryan, whose appearance was a surprise to the other seven, is set to leave for Fort Bragg, North Carolina before leaving for Iraq. Sarah and J.D. returned to San Francisco and Miami, respectively, while Kat has gotten a job as an I.T. specialist at the University of Montana. Baya has been producing music and deejaying while living with Scott and Devyn in New York City. Among the topics discussed are how life has changed for the cast, the argument in the season finale, Sarah and Kat's unresolved issues with J.D., the gender conflict in the house, with Ryan and Chet taking issue with what they saw as Sarah's lack of sincerity and prejudice, and the cast's feelings about Ryan's recall. It is revealed that Ryan and Belle broke up, and that he and Baya are in a relationship.

Chet Cannon later appeared in the 2010 VH1 Presents program, The New Virginity, which explores the pop culture movement in which young people declare their chastity, including entertainers and other public figures who make it a part of their public persona. He eventually moved to New York City, and does speaking engagements for Path-U-Find Media with fellow The Real World: New Orleans alumna Julie Stoffer. He continues to work in improv and with MTV. Cannon hosted after shows for The Real World: San Diego (2011) and Real World: Ex-Plosion. He got married in 2014. All of his former roommates were in attendance, excluding Sarah Rice.

Katelynn Cusanelli speaks across college campuses on LGBT issues. In 2008, she had been dating her boyfriend, Mike, for more than two years. She eventually married, but by July 2012 had recently divorced.

Scott Herman appeared in the movies Living Will and Heist. He is currently a personal trainer and has a YouTube channel with over 2 million subscribers.

Sarah Rice became engaged on October 15, 2014 and got married in May 2015. Susie Meister from Road Rules: Down Under served as a bridesmaid, while former roommates Chet Cannon and Baya Voce, alongside Frank Sweeney from The Real World: San Diego and Theresa Gonzalez from Fresh Meat II were in attendance. In 2018, she spoke about suffering a miscarriage. In the subsequent year, she announced her and husband Landon Patterson were going through a divorce.

Devyn Simone hosted and produced Love at First Swipe on TLC alongside Clinton Kelly from What Not to Wear. The show ran for 14 episodes total. Simone also hosted some episodes of The Wendy Williams Show. She got engaged in 2015.

The Challenge

Challenge in bold indicates that the contestant was a finalist on the Challenge.

Awards
In 2010, The Real World: Brooklyn was nominated for a GLAAD Media Award for "Outstanding Reality Program" during the 21st GLAAD Media Awards.

References

External links
The Real World: Brooklyn at mtv.com
Cast bio main page at mtv.com
Real World Dailies

Brooklyn
Television shows set in Brooklyn
Transgender-related television shows
2009 American television seasons
2009 in New York City
Television shows filmed in New York City